Urqu Jipiña (Aymara urqu male, male animal, jipiña squatting of animals, "where the male animals crouch", also spelled Orkho Jipina, Orkho Jipiña) is a mountain in the Bolivian Andes which reaches a height of approximately . It is located in the La Paz Department, Loayza Province, Luribay Municipality. Urqu Jipiña lies southwest of Q'ara Qullu.

References 

Mountains of La Paz Department (Bolivia)